Vieno is both a surname and a given name. Notable people with the name include:

Jukka Vieno (born 1957), Finnish writer
V. J. Sukselainen (1906–1995), Finnish politician and Prime Minister of Finland
Vieno Simonen (1898–1994), Finnish politician and farmer

Finnish feminine given names
Finnish masculine given names
Finnish-language surnames